Bastien Pourailly (born 31 January 1994) is a French rugby union player who plays for ASM Clermont Auvergne in the Top 14. His position is wing.

References

External links 
 Clermont profile
 L'Équipe profile

1994 births
Living people
Sportspeople from Pyrénées-Atlantiques
French rugby union players
Section Paloise players
ASM Clermont Auvergne players
Rugby union wings